A serpentine curve is a curve whose equation is of the form

Equivalently, it has a parametric representation 
, 

or functional representation

The curve has an inflection point at the origin.

History
Serpentine curves were studied by L'Hôpital and Huygens, and named and classified by Newton.

Visual appearance

External links
 MathWorld – Serpentine Equation
 

Plane curves